The thirty-second season of Saturday Night Live, an American sketch comedy series, originally aired in the United States on NBC between September 30, 2006, and May 19, 2007.

History
As in the previous season, The Lonely Island created another popular SNL Digital Short that aired around Christmas time; this time, it was the R&B video spoof "Dick in a Box" (featuring host Justin Timberlake). The short won a Creative Arts Emmy for Outstanding Music and Lyrics.

Cast
Before the start of the season, the show suffered massive budget cuts. These resulted with Finesse Mitchell, who had been a cast member for three seasons since 2003, being fired from the show, alongside longtime cast members Horatio Sanz and Chris Parnell, who had both been on the show for eight seasons since 1998. This was the second time Parnell had been fired from the show due to budget cuts, the first being after the 2000–01 season ended. In addition, longtime cast members Rachel Dratch (who had been on the show for seven seasons since 1999) and Tina Fey (who had been a staff writer since 1997, and a cast member for six seasons since 2000) left the show on their own terms, as both were to begin work on the NBC sitcom 30 Rock.

Bill Hader, Andy Samberg, Jason Sudeikis, and Kristen Wiig were all promoted to repertory status. Due to the budget cuts, this was the first time since the 1997–98 season that the show did not have any featured players or hire any new cast members (budget cuts also explains why the previous season had only 19 episodes instead of the usual 20). These changes also resulted in the smallest cast in recent memory, just 11 people.

With Fey's departure, Seth Meyers became Amy Poehler's co-anchor on Weekend Update. Don Roy King was hired as director, replacing Beth McCarthy-Miller.

A new logo was introduced this season. It is based on the logo seen during Dick Ebersol's tenure as showrunner between 1981 and 1985, but with a modern typeface. This logo would remain in use until the show's fortieth season.

Cast roster
Repertory players
Fred Armisen
Will Forte
Bill Hader
Darrell Hammond
Seth Meyers
Amy Poehler
Maya Rudolph
Andy Samberg
Jason Sudeikis
Kenan Thompson
Kristen Wiig

bold denotes Weekend Update anchor

Episodes

Specials

References

32
Saturday Night Live in the 2000s
2006 American television seasons
2007 American television seasons
Television shows directed by Don Roy King